Kiambere is a settlement in Kenya's Eastern Province. The Kiambere Dam is located nearby.

References 

Populated places in Eastern Province (Kenya)